Crestline is a census-designated place in the San Bernardino Mountains of San Bernardino County, California, USA. The population was 10,770 at the 2010 census, up from 10,218 at the 2000 census.

Geography

Crestline is located within the San Bernardino National Forest; Lake Gregory is located in the center of Crestline.

Climate
According to the Köppen Climate Classification system, Crestline has a warm-summer Mediterranean climate, abbreviated Csb on climate maps.

Demographics

2010
At the 2010 census Crestline had a population of 10,770. The racial makeup of Crestline was 9,289 (86.2%) White (77.0% Non-Hispanic White), 107 (1.0%) African American, 135 (1.3%) Native American, 96 (0.9%) Asian, 20 (0.2%) Pacific Islander, 526 (4.9%) from other races, and 597 (5.5%) from two or more races. Hispanic or Latino of any race were 1,775 persons (16.5%).

The census reported that 10,723 people (99.6% of the population) lived in households, 39 (0.4%) lived in non-institutionalized group quarters, and 8 (0.1%) were institutionalized.

There were 4,360 households, 1,286 (29.5%) had children under the age of 18 living in them, 2,108 (48.3%) were opposite-sex married couples living together, 451 (10.3%) had a female householder with no husband present, 247 (5.7%) had a male householder with no wife present.  There were 309 (7.1%) unmarried opposite-sex partnerships, and 57 (1.3%) same-sex married couples or partnerships. 1,190 households (27.3%) were one person and 362 (8.3%) had someone living alone who was 65 or older. The average household size was 2.46.  There were 2,806 families (64.4% of households); the average family size was 2.97.

The age distribution was 2,375 people (22.1%) under the age of 18, 875 people (8.1%) aged 18 to 24, 2,383 people (22.1%) aged 25 to 44, 3,838 people (35.6%) aged 45 to 64, and 1,299 people (12.1%) who were 65 or older.  The median age was 43.3 years. For every 100 females, there were 103.2 males.  For every 100 females age 18 and over, there were 103.5 males.

There were 7,333 housing units at an average density of 524.6 per square mile, of the occupied units 3,123 (71.6%) were owner-occupied and 1,237 (28.4%) were rented. The homeowner vacancy rate was 6.7%; the rental vacancy rate was 13.8%.  7,463 people (69.3% of the population) lived in owner-occupied housing units and 3,260 people (30.3%) lived in rental housing units.

According to the 2010 United States Census, Crestline had a median household income of $50,079, with 16.8% of the population living below the federal poverty line.

2000

At the 2000 census there were 10,218 people, 4,000 households, and 2,767 families in the CDP. The population density was 940.4 inhabitants per square mile (362.9/km). The racial makeup of the CDP was 88.0% White, 0.8% African American, 1.1% Native American, 0.6% Asian, 0.2% Pacific Islander, 5.0% from other races, and 4.3% from two or more races. Hispanic or Latino of any race were 10.5%.

Of the 4,000 households 33.4% had children under the age of 18 living with them, 53.0% were married couples living together, 10.6% had a female householder with no husband present, and 30.8% were non-families. 24.7% of households were one person and 6.6% were one person aged 65 or older.  The average household size was 2.6 and the average family size was 3.0.

The age distribution was 27.8% under the age of 18, 6.3% from 18 to 24, 27.7% from 25 to 44, 29.1% from 45 to 64, and 9.1% 65 or older.  The median age was 39 years. For every 100 females, there were 100.6 males.  For every 100 females age 18 and over, there were 97.0 males.

The median household income was $44,257 and the median family income  was $51,655. Males had a median income of $48,772 versus $28,750 for females. The per capita income for the CDP was $20,987.  About 6.6% of families and 8.9% of the population were below the poverty line, including 10.7% of those under age 18 and 4.8% of those age 65 or over.

Government

Education
Crestline Community is served by the Rim of the World Unified School District.  It includes three (K-5) elementary schools (Valley of Enchantment, Charles Hoffman, Lake Arrowhead), one (6-8) intermediate school (Mary Putnam Henck), and two high schools (Mountain, Rim Of The World Senior).
Calvary Chapel Bible College is also located in nearby Twin Peaks.

Neighborhoods in Crestline
The greater community of Crestline includes the neighborhoods known as Valley of Enchantment, Valley of the Moon, Cedarpines Park, and Twin Peaks.

Notable residents
 Judy Shapiro-Ikenberry (born 1942), long-distance runner
 Church of Spiritual Technology, a church part of the Church of Scientology is located in Crestline on CA-189

References

External links
 Mountain Arts Network - Crestline California
 Overview of Crestline CA via Statistical Atlas

Census-designated places in San Bernardino County, California
Census-designated places in California

CAR INSURANCE COMPANIES IN LAKE ARROWHEAD--CRESTLINE, CA